Asbury, North Carolina may refer to:

 Asbury, Stokes County, North Carolina
 Asbury, Wake County, North Carolina, in Wake County, North Carolina